Religious themes appear in fantasy fiction, including literature, film and television. These themes may be expressed directly, or through allegory and symbolism.

Afterlife

 The Brothers Lionheart by Astrid Lindgren.

Clericalism

 Philip Pullman's His Dark Materials series is heavy with anticlerical themes. The Catholic Church is depicted as an over-controlling, power-rich entity. In the trilogy's second book, The Subtle Knife, a plan emerges to declare war against heaven, and to destroy God's regent Metatron in order to give the world true free will.

Creation myths
 Ainulindalë ("Music of the Ainur") is the first story in J. R. R. Tolkien's fantasy collection The Silmarillion.

Christ

 C.S. Lewis' The Chronicles of Narnia abound in Christian allegory. Aslan, the divine creator and protector of Narnia, is envisioned not simply as an analogue to Jesus of Nazareth, but rather as a fantastic alternate version of Christ himself. For example, in The Lion, the Witch and the Wardrobe, an allegorical retelling of the Gospels, Aslan offers himself up as a sacrifice in place of the traitorous Edmund, and is mocked, tortured, executed and subsequently resurrected. Aslan himself blatantly alludes to his nature as an alternate Christ in the final scene of The Voyage of the Dawn Treader, wherein he reveals to the protagonists Edmund, Lucy and Eustace that in their own world, he is known by "another name", and that they must learn to know him by that name.
 The seventh arc of a popular manga series JoJo's Bizarre Adventure, Steel Ball Run shows one of the main characters, 14 year old Lucy Steel, being pregnant with a head of a saint (heavily implied to be Christ) in spite of her being a virgin, being directly influenced by the story of Virgin Mary and the birth of Christ.

Devil

 For Love of Evil (1988) by Piers Anthony
 Melkor is an Ainu, the antagonist of J. R. R. Tolkien's The Silmarillion and can be seen as the Devil of Tolkien's fictional world. In the creation myth of Ainulindalë the Ainur compose the great music before time begins with the harmony being disrupted by Melkor's "loud and vain" music as he contends with Eru Ilúvatar (his own creator), attempting to alter the Music and introduce what he believed to be elements purely of his own design. Later Ilúvatar takes the Ainur to see how the music, at the end of the void, created Arda, the fictional Middle-earth. Melkor then desires to rule Arda and later becomes the source from whom all evil in the world of Middle-earth ultimately stems.
 Lucifer is the main character in the comic book series Lucifer (DC Comics) and the TV series Lucifer.

Gods

 In Lois McMaster Bujold's Chalion novels, The Curse of Chalion and Paladin of Souls, there are five gods, with substantial consideration of free will and how the gods influence and interact with people.
 Small Gods (1992) by Terry Pratchett – On the Discworld, the power of a god is determined by how many people believe in them and as the God "Om" has ignored his believers for ages he finds himself stripped of his divine powers and only able to manifest himself as a tortoise.
 In Chosen of the Changeling by Gregory Keyes, gods and goddesses are not remote entities, but numerous and everywhere. There is a hierarchy where the smaller and less powerful exists inside rocks and trees, and more powerful ones controls forests and other areas. Especially the smaller ones interact regularly with humans. The most powerful exist simultaneously as four different beings.

Heaven

 To Reign in Hell (1984) by Steven Brust narrates an alternate account of the War in Heaven, casting Satan as a sympathetic protagonist.

Hell

 Inferno (1976) by Larry Niven and Jerry Pournelle.
 Escape from Hell (2009) by Larry Niven and Jerry Pournelle.

Morality

 The Time Quartet series by Madeleine L'Engle covers a good vs. evil "battle" over the hearts and minds of children and whole planets.

Theocracy

 The Goblin Tower (1968) by L. Sprague de Camp - An episode is set in the theocratic city-state of Tarxia.
 Lord of Light (1967) by Roger Zelazny - In the science fantasy novel a spaceshipload of humans set themselves up as gods and rulers of an alien race and their offspring.
 Small Gods (1992) by Terry Pratchett – The story of the comical fantasy novel is set in the land of Omnia, an oppressive theocracy that is controlled by a Church that worships the Great God Om and frequently rages war on non-believers.
 The Velgarth novels (1994–present) by Mercedes Lackey – The land of Karse in ruled by a priesthood. In earlier appearances the ruling priesthood is corrupt and oppressive, but later it is reformed and much improved by Solaris, the first woman to gain the combined religious and secular power in Karse.
 His Dark Materials (1995–2000) by Philip Pullman – A trilogy of fantasy novels, largely set in a world ruled by a theocracy known as the Magisterium.
 The television series Avatar: The Last Airbender/The Legend of Korra (2005–2008, 2012–2014) – Air Nomads, one of the four nations, has a Unitary Theocratic Senate from which then-avatar and Protagonist Aang was born. In a sequel the protagonist's first son Tenzin is now only first leader as 'Air Nation' and now under a unitary theocracy.
 In the Warhammer 40,000 world the Imperium of Man, is a theocracy administered by the High Lords of Terra in the God-Emperor's name.

Religious War
The Terra Incognita fantasy series by Kevin J. Anderson depicts two opposing religions going into an all-out religious war, fiercely contending for possession of a Holy City which is sacred to both (loosely modeled on the confrontation between Christianity and Islam over Jerusalem, during the Crusades). The followers of the two religions whip each other into a genocidal fury by an ever-escalating spiral of massacres and counter-massacres, atrocities and counter-atrocities. But finally, the God in which both of them profess to believe puts an end to the bloodshed by showing up in person at the middle of a battlefield and issuing a stern warning – unless they immediately stop killing each other in His name, he would consider wiping out all of them and starting a new Creation from scratch. The reader is shown that in fact, God was too tender-hearted to actually carry out this threat. But the humans who heard Him could not be sure of that, and they are intimidated into making peace, with their respective priesthoods dropping fanaticism and embarking on an ecumenical course.

See also
 List of fictional religions
 List of religious ideas in science fiction
 Religion in The Chronicles of Narnia
 Religious debates over the Harry Potter series

References

Fantasy-related lists
 
Religion-related lists